The Pearl Mosque is a name given to several religious structures: 
 The Moti Masjid (Lahore Fort), located inside the Lahore Fort in Lahore, Pakistan, that was built in 1630–35.
 The Moti Masjid (Agra Fort), located in the Agra Fort in Agra, India and was built around 1647-53 by Shah Jahan.
 The Moti Masjid (Red Fort), located inside the Red Fort in Delhi, India, that was built in 1659-60 by Aurangzeb.